Somalia–Serbia relations are foreign relations between Somalia and Serbia.  Both countries maintain diplomatic relations established between Somalia and SFR Yugoslavia, following Somali independence from Italy in the 1960s.

Yugoslavia formerly had an embassy in Mogadishu, and there is archived correspondence between the Yugoslav embassies in Mogadishu and Addis Ababa, Ethiopia in 1975, regarding the relations between the Soviet Union, Ethiopia, and Somalia; a situation that became the Ogaden War shortly afterwards, in 1977.

In early 2015, Serbia appointed its first ambassador to Somalia, Ivan Zivkovic (who was also ambassador to Kenya) since the Breakup of Yugoslavia and the Somali Civil War, both of which began in 1991. Zivkovic met with President Hassan Sheikh Mohamud in February, and received a warm welcome from the Somali government. Both parties announced plans for cooperation in the areas of development and vocational training for Somalia's youth, as well as agriculture, science, and health sectors.

In September 2021, Somalia re-opened an embassy in Belgrade.

See also 
 Yugoslavia and the Non-Aligned Movement
 Yugoslavia and the Organisation of African Unity

References 

 

 
Serbia
Somalia